Mizpah Methodist Church is a historic Methodist church located near Olar, Bamberg County, South Carolina.  It was built in 1856, and is a  frame church sheathed in weatherboard and includes Greek Revival and Gothic Revival architectural elements.  Surrounding the church is the church cemetery, which contains gravestones and iron Maltese cross markers for a number of Confederate veterans.

It was built in 1856 and added to the National Register in 2000.

References

Methodist churches in South Carolina
Churches on the National Register of Historic Places in South Carolina
Carpenter Gothic church buildings in South Carolina
Greek Revival church buildings in South Carolina
Churches completed in 1856
20th-century Methodist church buildings in the United States
Buildings and structures in Bamberg County, South Carolina
National Register of Historic Places in Bamberg County, South Carolina